is a Japanese football player. He plays for Nongbua Pitchaya in the Thai League 2.

Club statistics

References

External links

J. League (#23)

1988 births
Living people
Kyoto Sangyo University alumni
Association football people from Ehime Prefecture
Japanese footballers
J2 League players
Ehime FC players
V-Varen Nagasaki players
Yusei Ogasawara
Association football midfielders